Lin Hsi-yao (born 25 December 1961) is a Taiwanese politician.

Early life
Lin studied civil engineering at National Taiwan University, where he earned a bachelor's and degree and a master's degree in the subject in 1983 and 1990, respectively.

Vice Premiership
On 7 April 2016, Premier-designate Lin Chuan appointed Lin Hsi-yao to the position of vice premier. Lin Hsi-yao resigned in September 2017, and was shortly afterward presented with an Order of Brilliant Star.

Later political career
Lin later worked on Tsai Ing-wen's 2020 presidential campaign. She won a second term, after which Lin was named secretary-general of the Democratic Progressive Party.

References

1961 births
Living people
Taiwanese civil engineers
National Taiwan University alumni
Democratic Progressive Party (Taiwan) politicians
Politicians of the Republic of China on Taiwan from Yilan County, Taiwan
Chairpersons of the Taiwan Provincial Government
Magistrates of Taipei County
Recipients of the Order of Brilliant Star